Kyaw Min Than (born 8 November 1997) is a Myanmar professional footballer who plays for Chin United. 

Born in Myaungmya, Kyaw Min Than joined the youth team of  Ayeyawady United in 2015, He played youth team and then transferred to City Yangon with loan in 2017 MNL second half season. He won 2017 MNL-2 champion with City Yangon.  After four year played for Ayeyawady United , he completely moved to Chin United. He scored his first time ever goal for Chin United against Yangon United.

Honours

Club

City Yangon
MNL-2 (1):  2017

References

External links
Interview with player
play match

1997 births
Living people
Burmese footballers
Myanmar international footballers
Association football forwards